Yasmine Oudni (born August 2, 1989, in Tizi Ouzou, Algeria) is an Algerian international volleyball player.

Her contract with the G.S. Petroliers is up in 2014. In 2012 the team went to Egypt to prepare for the CAVB Women's Volleyball Olympic Qualifiers Tournament.

Club information
Current club :  GSP (ex MC Algiers)
Previous club :  AS DE L'UNION (TOULOUSE) 
Previous club :   GSP (ex MC Algiers)
Debut club :  AC Tizi Ouzou

References

Sources

Living people
Algerian women's volleyball players
Competitors at the 2009 Mediterranean Games
Sportspeople from Tizi Ouzou
1989 births
Algerian expatriates in France
Expatriate volleyball players in France
Mediterranean Games competitors for Algeria
21st-century Algerian people